Imitation of Christ is a film shot and directed by Andy Warhol in 1967.

Summary 
The title for this film comes from the De imitatione Christi, a spiritual guide written in the fifteenth century by Dutch mystic/author Thomas à Kempis (1390–1471). The film itself is a realistic dramatic comedy about a handsome young man called Son, silent and moody, who spends much time in his bedroom with the family maid, who feeds him corn flakes, strokes his hair, and reads to him from the Imitatione Christi. Elsewhere in the family home, the young man's mother and father lie in bed and argue over Son, trying to analyze what's wrong with him, while, at the same time, admitting their physical attraction toward him, and lamenting over their own sad lives. Son also has angry arguments there in his home with his abrasive girlfriend, over minor matters. Intercut into the film are outdoor scenes of Son ambling through the streets of San Francisco with a hobo.

Cast 
 Brigid Berlin (also known as Brigid Polk) played Mother.
 Bob Olivo (also known as Ondine) played Father.
 Patrick Tilden Close (credited as Pat Close for previous work as a child actor in both film and television) played Son.
 Nico played The Maid.
 Taylor Mead played Hobo.
 Andrea "Whips" Feldman played Son's Girlfriend.

Production 
Andy Warhol shot sixteen 32-minute reels of film for all the interior shots (with all of the cast except for Taylor Mead) during January 1967 in a Hollywood Hills home called the Castle (which Warhol rented for his L.A. visits).  The exterior segments with Pat Tilden Close and Taylor Mead were filmed in San Francisco parks and streets during May 1967.

A long version of the film (480 minutes) premiered in November 1967,  and then was withdrawn from circulation — the long film was  thought lost for many years, and then was found in the early 2000s.  In December 1967, the entire eight-hour film appeared as a segment within another Warhol film, the 25-hour-long **** (aka Four Stars).  In late 1969, Andy Warhol and Paul Morrissey condensed the eight-hour Imitation of Christ to 105 minutes, and re-released it under the same name.

Excerpts of Imitation of Christ were also included within the film Pie in the Sky: The Brigid Berlin Story, a 75-minute documentary about the life of actress Brigid Berlin (Brigid Polk), directed by Vincent Fremont and Shelly Dunn Fremont, produced by Vincent Fremont Enterprises, and released September 7, 2000.

Critical reception 
There was much praise at the initial release, calling Warhol "the equivalent of Victor Hugo", but there was much criticism of the fact the film was not released after the premiere event except in a shortened form.

See also
List of American films of 1967
Andy Warhol filmography
List of longest films by running time

References

Sources 
 "The American Film Institute Catalog of Motion Pictures produced in the United States, Issues 1941-1950" University of California Press  (1997) , page 524

External links 
 
 Imitation of Christ webpage on the NICO Films website

1967 films
Films directed by Andy Warhol
American avant-garde and experimental films
1960s English-language films
1960s American films